Hamengkubuwono VII (also spelled Hamengkubuwana VII, 4 February 1839 – 30 December 1921) was the seventh sultan of Yogyakarta, reigning from 22 December 1877 to 29 January 1921.

His residence after abdication of the crown in the early of 19th Century is now known as the Museum Ambarrukmo, part of the Royal Ambarrukmo Yogyakarta hotel complex.

See also
Hamengkubuwana

Notes

Sultans of Yogyakarta
Burials at Imogiri
1839 births
1921 deaths
Indonesian royalty